A map analysis is a study regarding map types, i.e. political maps, military maps, contour lines etc., and the unique physical qualities of a map, i.e. scale, title, legend etc.
It is also a way of decoding the message and symbols of the map and placing it within its proper spatial and cultural context.

 

Cartography